Ambitions is the eighth studio album by Japanese rock band One Ok Rock. It was released on January 11, 2017 for the Japanese version album under the Japanese label A-Sketch and on January 13, 2017 for the international version under the American label Fueled by Ramen.

The song "Always Coming Back" was featured in NTT Docomo's phone commercial series, "Kanjou no Subete / Nakama". After signing with Fueled by Ramen on September 11, 2016, they released the lead single "Taking Off" on September 16, 2016 that was used as a theme song for the Japanese movie "Museum", which starred Shun Oguri, and the second single "Bedroom Warfare" on November 18, 2016. The song "I was King" was released on December 15, 2016. On January 9, 2017, they released their single "We Are".

Sold in both Limited and Regular editions, the album was available for pre-order on iTunes starting November 18, 2016. The Japanese Limited edition album features bonus tracks and a DVD of studio acoustic sessions, while the Ambitions international version CD came with a T-shirt bundle.

Background 
In an interview with UK rock magazine Kerrang! issue number 1649 dated December 10, 2016, One Ok Rock vocalist Moriuchi explained the three themes on this album: Hope, ambition, and singing together. He said that the band were at a point in their career where they were trying to break a new market and go worldwide. It was the ambition that was inside of them that pushed them to try new things and to be successful, which became a prevailing theme on the record. The album artwork is yellow, which is the colour of hope. The overall themes of the album are: "Ambition", the title, yellow is the hope, and the songs are anthemic in quality especially in the choruses. In another interview, Moriuchi said, "We wanted to make an album where we can all sing along together. By singing strongly in unison about hope, we wish to reinforce the importance of not giving up."

Themes 
Most of the album themes are more personal topics compared to their previous album 35xxxv. It focuses mostly about achieving dreams, life, family, and struggles of depression. Their second track, "Bombs Away" tells about fighting the inner demons or "you versus yourself". "We Are" and "Jaded", are encouraging tracks for the people who lost their hopes and symbolizes empowerment for achieving their goals. "Hard To Love" and "Always Coming Back" are more personal tracks in Ambitions, Moriuchi wrote those songs dedicated to his father. "I Was King" tells the band's ambition to reach some bigger dreams. In Japanese edition, "20/20" is a breakup song, and tells about lovers being cheated by their own beloved ones. "Listen" is about people's struggles with suicide and depression, the band wanted to wake them up and not giving up their life. "Lost in Tonight" is merely a party song. Meanwhile, their first single "Taking Off" tells about "passions for doing what you love". "Start Again" and their last track along 5 Seconds of Summer, "Take What You Want" are the band's notes and commitment to leaving their past and being ready to overcome what's ahead on their future.

Promotion 
Fueled by Ramen released One Ok Rock's music videos of "Taking Off" on October 25, 2016 and "Bedroom Warfare" on November 17, 2016 which were both directed by Sitcom Soldiers. Then on December 16, 2016, they released the band's visualizer video of "I was King" which was directed and animated by Ruth Barrett along with two assistant animators Eva Wagner and Sam Thompson.

On November 13, 2016, One Ok Rock released a compilation of footage from One Ok Rock 2016 Special Live in Nagisaen and mixed with the song "Taking Off" then on November 30, 2016, they released a Studio Jam Session video of "Taking Off" which were both directed by Naoto Amazutsumi.

On January 1, 2017, One Ok Rock opened a special site called "World Ambitions". This is a celebration of the album "Ambitions" which will be released on January 11, 2017. "World Ambitions" is a website that visually represents images of "hope" being shared and spread from users around the world through the website and Twitter/Instagram. People from all over the world can upload pictures with yellow in it that symbolize hope and connecting them all. The user shares the desired image by SNS (Twitter, Instagram). It is also possible to upload simultaneously with multiple names.

On January 9, 2017, the band released the music video of "We Are" (Japanese version) while Fueled by Ramen released their music video of the international version of "We Are". Both videos were directed by Mark Staubach.

In January 2017, the band went on their North American tour for 6 concerts, and from February till May 2017, they held 32 concerts in some Japanese arenas.

Commercial performance
In Japan, Ambitions debuted at number one on the Daily Oricon Albums Chart, selling 102,408 units. For its first week on the Weekly Oricon Albums Chart, it entered atop the chart with over 232,710 copies sold; It sold more copies than its competitor of the week, SMAP's greatest hits album Smap 25 Years (2016). Ambitions became the band's second number one album, and also resulted in becoming their highest first week sales for one of their albums.

One OK Rock had the world's best-selling album with Ambitions during the week of January 25, 2017. It topped the Global Album Chart with 315,000 equivalent sales (including paid downloads and streaming).

Accolades

Year-end lists
Alternative Press listed the song "Jaded" (with Alex Gaskarth) in their ranking of 12 Best Vocal Collabs of 2017.

Track listing

Notes 
  "Ambitions" (Introduction) is an instrumental song composed by Takahiro Moriuchi, Toru Yamashita, Tomoya Kanki, Ryota Kohama and Colin Brittain
  denotes an additional producer

Personnel
Credits adapted from the liner notes of Ambitions (Japanese edition).

One Ok Rock
 Takahiro "Taka" Moriuchi – Vocals
 Toru Yamashita – guitar
 Ryota Kohama – bass 
 Tomoya Kanki – drums

Production 

 Colin Brittain – production, mixing (1), production, engineering, programming (2, 4, 5, 10, 13, 14), engineering, editing, programming, additional production (6, 9), production, recording, programming (12) 
 Dan Lancaster – mixing (2, 5, 9, 10, 12, 13, 14), production, engineering, mixing (3)
 Jonathan Gerring – additional programming, additional production (2, 12), programming, additional production (4, 10) 
 Neil Avron – mixing (4)
 Ben Sabin – additional engineering, digital editing, piano (4)
 Nick Long –  additional instruments, backing vocals (4, 10, 13)
 Zakk Cervini – mixing (6), engineering, editing, programming, additional production (6, 9)
 John Feldmann – production, recording (6, 9)
 Matt Pauling – engineering, editing, programming, additional production (6, 9)
 Şerban Ghenea – mixing (7)
 Andrew Goldstein – production (7)
 John Hanes – engineering for mixing (7)
 Kane Churko – production, engineering, mixing, mastering (8)
 CJ Baran – production (11)
 Mike Shinoda – additional production (11)
 Mitch McCarthy – mixing (11)
 Florian Ammon – additional vocal recording, engineering (10, 12)
 Ted Jensen – mastering (1–7, 9–14)
 Bruno Agra – drum tech

Additional personnel
 Nolan Sipe – additional vocals (7)
 Aimer – backing vocals (10)
 Tyler Carter – vocal direction (12)
 Chris Baseford – Avril Lavigne's vocal production (10)
 Phil Threlfall –  5 Seconds of Summer vocal recording (14)

Design
 Kazuaki Seki – art direction
 Daichi Shiono – design

Charts

Weekly charts

Year-end charts

Singles

Other charted songs

Certifications

Release history

See also
 List of Oricon number-one albums of 2017

References

2017 albums
One Ok Rock albums
A-Sketch albums
Fueled by Ramen albums
Albums produced by Colin Brittain
Albums produced by John Feldmann
Alternative rock albums by Japanese artists